Hemmingen is a town in the district of Hanover, in Lower Saxony, Germany. It is situated approximately 6 km south of Hanover.

Until December 2004, Hemmingen belonged to the Regierungsbezirk Hannover, which was dissolved in January 2005.

Districts
Hemmingen is divided into 7 districts: 
 Arnum
 Devese
 Harkenbleck
 Hemmingen-Westerfeld
 Hiddestorf
 Ohlendorf
 Wilkenburg

Education
Hemmingen has 3 primary schools and one comprehensive school.

Twin towns – sister cities

Hemmingen is twinned with:
 Murowana Goślina, Poland
 South Lanarkshire, Scotland, United Kingdom
 Yvetot, France

References

External links

  

Hanover Region